Ramil Teymurovich Sheydayev (born 15 March 1996) is an Azerbaijani professional footballer who plays for Qarabağ and the Azerbaijan national football team.

Early and personal life
He was born in Saint Petersburg to an Azerbaijani father and a Russian mother.

Club career

Zenit St. Petersburg
He made his professional debut in the Russian Professional Football League for FC Zenit-2 St. Petersburg on 19 April 2014 in a game against Znamya Truda.

He made his Russian Premier League debut for FC Zenit St. Petersburg on 26 October 2014 in a game against FC Mordovia Saransk.

He left Zenit on 5 July 2016.

Trabzonspor
On 12 July 2016, he signed a four-year contract with Trabzonspor. Sheydayev made his Süper Lig debut for Trabzonspor in a 1–0 away victory against Kayserispor on 5 December 2016. He scored his first goal for Trabzonspor in the Turkish Cup match against Ardahanspor in a 6–0 home victory on 21 September 2016.

He left Trabzonspor on 9 August 2018.

Loan to Žilina
On 11 February 2017, it was announced that Sheydayev had joined Slovak club Žilina on loan for 1.5 years. On 26 February 2017, Sheydayev made his Žilina debut in a 4–1 home victory against Zlaté Moravce, in which he played the full 90 minutes. He scored his first goal for Žilina in the Slovak Super Liga match against Tatran Prešov in a 3–0 home victory on 2 April 2017. Ramil also played for Žilina B a total of five games and scored five goals in the Slovakia 2. Liga.

Sheydayev made his European debut in 2017 against Danish Copenhagen in the second qualification round of the UEFA Champions League in Štadión pod Dubňom.

Loan to Qarabağ
On 31 August 2017, Qarabağ announced the signing of Sheydayev on a season-long loan deal. Sheydayev made his Azerbaijan Premier League debut for Qarabağ in a 2–0 home victory against Kapaz on 17 September 2017. He scored his first goal for Qarabağ in the Azerbaijan Premier League match against Kapaz in a 1–0 away victory on 14 April 2018.

Ramil Sheydayev made his debut for the UEFA Champions League group stage game in a 1–1 away draw against Atlético Madrid in Wanda Metropolitano on 31 October 2017.

Krylia Sovetov Samara
On 17 August 2018, Sheydayev signed one-year contract with Krylia Sovetov Samara. He made his Russian Premier League debut with Krylia Sovetov on 19 August 2018 as a substitute for Vladimir Poluyakhtov in a game against Lokomotiv Moscow. He opened the 2019 calendar year part of the season by scoring in 3 games in a row, as Krylia acquired 7 points, including a goal on his 23rd birthday against FC Anzhi Makhachkala.

Dynamo Moscow
On 2 July 2019, he signed a one-year contract with Dynamo Moscow. Dynamo terminated his contract on 9 January 2020.

Sabah
On 17 February 2020, Sheydayev signed for Sabah on a contract until the end of the 2019–20 season. On 1 August 2020, He extended his contract with Sabah, until June 2021. Sheydayev left Sabah in June 2021 when his contract expired.

Qarabağ
On 1 July 2021, Qarabağ announced the signing of Sheydayev on a two-year contract.

International career

Russian national youth teams
Sheydayev won the 2013 UEFA European Under-17 Championship with Russia, scoring two goals in the semifinal penalty shootout against Sweden and one more in the final penalty shootout against Italy. He also participated in the 2013 FIFA U-17 World Cup.

Later he represented Russia national under-19 football team at the 2015 UEFA European Under-19 Championship, where Russia came in second place, and he was selected for the team of the tournament.

Azerbaijan
Sheydayev was called up and played for the Azerbaijan national football team in a 2018 FIFA World Cup qualification 1-0 win over San Marino.

On 8 October 2017, he scored his first senior international goal for the Azerbaijan national football team, in a 2018 FIFA World Cup qualification against Germany in Kaiserslautern.

He is currently ranked as the second highest all-time goalscorer in the history of the national team with 9 goals (tied with Emin Makhmudov and Vagif Javadov).

Career statistics

Club

International 

Scores and results list Azerbaijan's goal tally first, score column indicates score after each Sheydayev goal.

Honours
Zenit Saint Petersburg
Russian Premier League: 2014–15

MŠK Žilina
Fortuna Liga: 2016-17

Qarabağ FK
Azerbaijan Premier League: 2017-18, 2021–22
Azerbaijan Cup: 2021–22

Russia U17
UEFA European Under-17 Championship: 2013

References

External links

Profile by FC Krylia Sovetov
Video about career of Ramil Sheydayev

1996 births
Living people
Footballers from Saint Petersburg
Association football forwards
Citizens of Azerbaijan through descent
Azerbaijani footballers
Azerbaijan international footballers
Azerbaijani expatriate footballers
Russian footballers
Russia youth international footballers
Russia under-21 international footballers
Russian sportspeople of Azerbaijani descent
Russian Premier League players
Süper Lig players
Slovak Super Liga players
Azerbaijan Premier League players
FC Zenit Saint Petersburg players
FC Rubin Kazan players
Trabzonspor footballers
MŠK Žilina players
Qarabağ FK players
PFC Krylia Sovetov Samara players
FC Dynamo Moscow players
Sabah FC (Azerbaijan) players
Expatriate footballers in Turkey
Azerbaijani expatriate sportspeople in Turkey
Expatriate footballers in Slovakia
FC Zenit-2 Saint Petersburg players